The Gonfalonier of the Church or Papal Gonfalonier ("standard-bearer") was a military and political office of the Papal States. Originating from the use of the Papal banner during combat, the office later became largely ceremonial and political. At his nomination, the gonfalonier was given two banners, one with the arms of the Church (vexillum cum armis Ecclesiæ) and another with the arms of the reigning pope (cum armis suis). The gonfalonier was entitled to include ecclesiastical emblems (the Keys of St. Peter and the ombrellino) upon his own arms, usually only during his term of office but on occasion permanently. Pope Innocent XII ended the rank, along with the captaincy general, and replaced them both with the position of flag-bearer of the Holy Roman Church, which later became hereditary in the Naro Patrizi.

List of gonfaloniers of the Church

See also
 Gonfaloniere
 Gonfalone of the Church
 Captain General of the Church

References

Papal States military personnel
1059 establishments in Europe
11th-century establishments in Italy
1689 disestablishments in the Papal States
11th-century establishments in the Papal States